Mediodactylus spinicauda, also known as the Kopet Dagh bent-toed gecko or spiny-tailed thin-toed gecko, is a species of lizard in the family Gekkonidae. It is endemic to northeastern Iran and southern Turkmenistan.

References

Mediodactylus
Reptiles described in 1887